The commune of Ndava is a commune of Mwaro Province in central Burundi. The capital lies at Ndava.

References

Communes of Burundi
Mwaro Province